The 2003 Ondrej Nepela Memorial was the 11th edition of an annual senior-level international figure skating competition held in Bratislava, Slovakia. It took place between September 24 and 27, 2003 at the Ondrej Nepela Ice Rink. Skaters competed in two disciplines: men's singles and ladies' singles. The competition is named for 1972 Olympic gold medalist Ondrej Nepela.

Results

Men

Ladies

External links
 11th Ondrej Nepela Memorial
 2003 Ondrej Nepela Memorial results

Ondrej Nepela Memorial, 2003
Ondrej Nepela Memorial
Ondrej Nepela Memorial, 2003